"Duele" ("It Hurts") is the lead single from Chenoa's fifth studio album, Desafiando la gravedad. The single premiered for the first time on July 25, 2009, on Cadena Dial. The digital single was released on August 4, 2009, via iTunes.

Charts 
"Duele" debuted at number 41 on the official Spanish Singles Chart by PROMUSICAE. The song peaked at number 14.

Release history

References

External links 

2009 singles
2009 songs
Universal Music Group singles
Songs written by Yoel Henriquez